François Bausch (born 16 October 1956) is a Luxembourgish politician serving as Second Deputy Prime Minister of Luxembourg since 2019. He is a member of the Chamber of Deputies as well as an alderman and member of the communal council of Luxembourg City.  He is leader of the Greens in the Chamber.

Political career 
Bausch was first elected to the Chamber of Deputies in the 1989 legislative election.  He resigned on 11 October 1992, along with Jean Huss, under the Greens' agreed rotation system, allowing other candidates to serve as deputies.  In the 1993 local elections, Bausch was elected to the communal council of Luxembourg City (starting 1 January 1994, and he was returned to the Chamber at the following year's election.  In 1999, Bausch finished second to Renée Wagener amongst Greens candidates in the Centre constituency, with those two being elected.

In 1999, Bausch was a founding member of anti-free trade and pro-transaction tax (Tobin Tax) group, ATTAC Luxembourg, and the only member of Luxembourg parliament to do so.
In the 2004 election, Bausch came top of the Greens' list by a comfortable distance on an improved result for the party (indeed, he finished fifth amongst all candidates), and was duly returned to the Chamber.  On 3 August 2004, Bausch also became leader of the Greens' group in the Chamber.  In the 2005 communal elections, the Democratic Party (DP)-Christian Social People's Party (CSV) coalition in Luxembourg City broke down, clearing the way for a DP-Greens cabinet, under which Bausch was appointed échevin.

As chairman of the Parliamentary Control Commission for the Luxembourg Secret Service (SREL), he initiated an investigation in late 2012 into alleged secret recordings of the Prime Minister Jean-Claude Juncker and Grand Duke Henry. This investigation became quickly politicized and mutated into a secret service enquiry commission, chaired by Socialist MP Alex Bodry and charged with investigating the activities and oversight of the SREL. However, in a strange twist, Bausch and other members of the Parliamentary Control Commission were allowed to join this "enquiry commission" that was legally responsible for investigating the SREL and its oversight, which includes the Parliamentary Control Commission itself. The Enquiry Commission was beset by partisan political actions and questionable legal tactics, including frequent leaks to journalists and politically motivated police raids, to the point that CSV MP Michel Wolter called for the journalists of the state owned station radio 100,7 to reveal their sources, who were suspected of being fellow non-CSV MPs and of fabricating information regarding secret dossiers of the SREL to suit their agenda.  On 20 June 2013, Bausch, leaked a "draft" report from the commission widely to the Luxembourg press that placed all blame on the Prime Minister and laid no fault on the Parliamentary Control Commission.

During Bausch’s time in office, the government committed to injecting an extra billion euros into its defence forces, on top of 10 billion euros ($10.98 billion) already agreed, prompted by Russia's invasion of Ukraine. He also oversaw efforts of the Belgian army to recruit 2,500 soldiers in 2022 to reinforce its military, currently standing at around 25,000.

See also

 Bettel-Schneider Ministry (2013 - )

References

External links
 Chamber of Deputies official website biography

1956 births
Deputy Prime Ministers of Luxembourg
Councillors in Luxembourg City
Members of the Chamber of Deputies (Luxembourg)
Members of the Chamber of Deputies (Luxembourg) from Centre
Living people
Luxembourgian people in rail transport
People from Luxembourg City
The Greens (Luxembourg) politicians
Ministers for Defence of Luxembourg